The Ladino people are a mix of mestizo or Hispanicized peoples in Latin America, principally in Central America. The demonym Ladino is a Spanish word that is related to Latino. Ladino is an exonym initially used during the colonial era to refer to those Spanish-speakers who were not Peninsulares, Criollos or indigenous peoples.

Guatemala

The Ladino population in Guatemala is officially recognized as a distinct ethnic group, and the Ministry of Education of Guatemala uses the following definition: 
"The ladino population has been characterized as a heterogeneous population which expresses itself in the Spanish language as a maternal language, which possesses specific cultural traits of Hispanic origin mixed with indigenous cultural elements, and dresses in a style commonly considered as western."The population censuses include the ladino population as one of the different ethnic groups in Guatemala.

In popular use, the term ladino commonly refers to non-indigenous Guatemalans, as well as mestizos and westernized Amerindians. The word was popularly thought to be derived from a mix of Latino and ladrón, the Spanish word for "thief", but is not necessarily or popularly considered a pejorative. The word is actually derived from the old Spanish ladino (inherited from the same Latin root Latinus that the Spanish word Latino was later borrowed from), originally referring to those who spoke Romance languages in medieval times, and later also developing the separate meaning of "crafty" or "astute". In the Central American colonial context, it was first used refer to those Amerindians who came to speak only Spanish, and later included their mestizo descendants.

Ladino is sometimes used to refer to the mestizo middle class, or to the population of indigenous peoples who have attained some level of upward social mobility above the largely impoverished indigenous masses. This relates especially to achieving some material wealth and adopting a North American lifestyle. In many areas of Guatemala,  it is used in a wider sense, meaning "any Guatemalan whose primary language is Spanish".

Indigenist rhetoric sometimes uses ladino in the second sense, as a derogatory term for indigenous peoples who are seen as having betrayed their homes by becoming part of the middle class. Some may deny indigenous heritage to assimilate.   "The 20th century K'iche Maya political activist, Rigoberta Menchú, born in 1959, used the term this way in her noted memoir, which many considered controversial. She illustrates the use of ladino both as a derogatory term, when discussing an indigenous person becoming mestizo/ladino, and in terms of  the general mestizo community identifying as ladino as a kind of happiness.

See also

References

Further reading
 Adams, Richard N. Guatemalan Ladinization and History. In: The Americas, Vol. 50, No. 4 (Apr., 1994), pp. 527–543. Academy of American Franciscan History.
 Falla, Ricardo (translated by Phillip Berryman). Quiché rebelde: religious conversion, politics, and ethnic identity in Guatemala. University of Texas Press, 2001.  in Google books
Martínez Peláez, Severo. La patria del criollo: Ensayo de interpretación de la realidad colonial guatemalteca. Guatemala: Editorial Universitaria, USAC, 1970.

Ethnic groups in Central America
Ethnic groups in South America
Multiracial affairs in the Americas
Latin American caste system